The Great River Bridge is an asymmetrical, single tower cable-stayed bridge over the Mississippi River. It carries U.S. Route 34 from Burlington, Iowa to the town of Gulf Port, Illinois.

History
Construction began in 1989, but work on the main tower did not begin until April 1990. During the Great Flood of 1993, construction continued despite record crests on the Mississippi below. The final cost of the bridge was $49 million, about 16 percent over budget.

The Great River Bridge replaced the MacArthur Bridge, an aging two-lane, cantilevered, steel toll bridge built in 1917. At the time, the bridge was in desperate need of repair, or replacement, as it swayed ominously when two semis crossed the bridge at the same time on the two lanes of traffic.  After the bridge was dismantled, the engineers discovered that the supports weren't sunk into the bedrock far enough, causing undermining of the piers. The new bridge is five lanes wide (two westbound, three eastbound), with piers sunk over 90 feet into bedrock, and provides a safer crossing across the Mississippi River than the old bridge.

Events
In the early morning of May 1, 2008, five barges broke loose of their moorings, with two of those striking the easternmost pylon of the bridge on the Henderson County, Illinois side of the river.  The bridge was closed while it could be inspected by the Iowa Department of Transportation for damage and repairs.  A third barge continued downstream, striking the BNSF Railroad owned Burlington Rail Bridge.  The highway bridge was reopened the following day.

On June 17, 2008, the bridge was closed due to flooding.

Every year on the second Saturday of May the Great River Bridge Race is run. The  race starts at the Iowa on ramp and runs the first mile in Iowa including running up Snake Alley. It then runs across the bridge through Illinois on U.S. Route 34 and finishes on Front St. in front of the Port of Burlington.

See also
List of crossings of the Upper Mississippi River

References

Fields, Ron. "Bridge spans a decade." The Hawk Eye Newspaper, https://web.archive.org/web/20060222085230/http://edkraemer.com/news/news_detail.asp?id=115 via Edward Kraemer & Sons, Inc. August 22, 2004. Retrieved January 14, 2006.
The Hawk Eye. "Barge strikes close U.S. 34, BNSF bridges" The Hawk Eye, Thursday, May 1, 2008

External links

Civil Engineering Database
 documenting previous bridge

Bridges over the Mississippi River
Cable-stayed bridges in the United States
Road bridges in Illinois
Road bridges in Iowa
Bridges of the United States Numbered Highway System
Buildings and structures in Burlington, Iowa
Bridges in Des Moines County, Iowa
Buildings and structures in Henderson County, Illinois
U.S. Route 34
Bridges completed in 1993
Former toll bridges in Illinois
Former toll bridges in Iowa
Steel bridges in the United States
1993 establishments in Iowa
1993 establishments in Illinois
Interstate vehicle bridges in the United States